Vazhakulam is a village in Muvattupuzha Talukis in Ernakulam district in the Indian state of Kerala. This town is known as Pineapple City due to its large-scale pineapple farms.

Another village named Vazhakulam, is located in Aluva.

Economy 
The town is the largest Asian pineapple market. Kerala Agricultural University established a Pineapple Research Station at Vazhakulam in 1995. The pineapples cultivated there have achieved a geographic indication. Vazhakulam pineapples are marketed as GI tagged products. Rice used to be the main crop of this area in the 1960s and 1970s, but the advent of rubber cultivation turned many rice fields and estates into rubber plantations.

Demographics 
The population of this area largely consists of Syrian Catholic Christians. 

Many Hindu families have made this place their home.(?)

Educational institutions
Viswajyothi College of Engineering and Technology, Vazhakulam
St. George College, Vazhakulam
Chavara International Academy, Vazhakulam
Carmel CMI Public School, Vazhakulam
Infant Jesus High School, Vazhakulam
St. Little Theresas High School, Vazhakulam
St. George's TTI, Vazhakulam
St. Reetha's L.P. School, Theakkumala
St. Thomas School, Vengachuvadu
The Bethlehem International Vazhakulam
Vimalamatha High School Kadalikkad
St. Sebastian's HS, Memadangu
Govt. L P School, Neerampuzha
Govt. L P School, Maniyantharam

Hospitals
St. George's Hospital Vazhakulam
Govt. Hospital Vazhakulam

Churches
St. George Syro-Malabar Catholic Forane Church
Carmel Monastery
Holy Family Church Bethleham
Zion Gospel Church & Ministries
St Sebastians church,Arikuzha

Temple
Among the famous Hindu temples in this area are the Lord Subramanya temple, Vallikkada Bhagavathi temple and Pudussery Kalari Bhagavathi temple. Other nearby temples include Sree Dharma Sastha Temple in Mangalloor and Bhagavathi Temple in Kalloorkad.

Banks
Canara Bank
Federal Bank
State Bank Of India
South Indian Bank
Kerala Gramin Bank
Service Co-operative bank No:751

Sports

 Volleyball - Vazhakulam has a great volleyball culture. This town contributed many good players to the Indian volleyball. All the volleyball interests in this town is related to St. George's Volley Ball Club.

 Basketball - Carmel cmi public school indoor stadium provides basketball facilities and nourishing the young talents.

Geography 
Vazhakulam lies east of the town of Muvattupuzha on the Muvattupuzha - Thodupuzha road. Nearby towns include:
 Kavana
 Memadangu
 Kadalikkad
 Madakkathanam
 Manjalloor
 Kalloorkad
 Nadukkara
 Avoly
 Anikkad -Anicadu
 Vadakode
 Thekkummala
 Bethlehem
Mullappuzhachal

Notables 

 K. M. George, the founder of the Kerala Congress

See also
Muvattupuzha
Arakuzha
Thodupuzha
Ernakulam

References

Cities and towns in Ernakulam district
Suburbs of Kochi